The Teichgraeber–Runbeck House is a historic Queen Anne-style house at 116 Mill Street in Lindsborg, Kansas. It was built during 1906-07 and added to the National Register of Historic Places in 2005.

It is a three-story brick house built on a limestone foundation.

It was deemed notable "for its historical association with the Smoky Valley Roller Mill and ... for its architectural significance as an example of a Queen Anne residence."

References

Houses completed in 1906
Houses on the National Register of Historic Places in Kansas
Houses in McPherson County, Kansas
Queen Anne architecture in Kansas
Lindsborg, Kansas
National Register of Historic Places in McPherson County, Kansas
1906 establishments in Kansas